The Héros was a first-rate 118-gun ship of the line of the French Navy, of the Océan type, designed by Jacques-Noël Sané.

Ordered in 1812, she was disarmed in 1816 in an unfinished state.

She was eventually broken up in 1828 without having ever been commissioned.

References

Ships of the line of the French Navy
Océan-class ships of the line
1813 ships